Pak Sha Tsuen is a walled village in Shap Pat Heung, Yuen Long District, Hong Kong.

Administration
Pak Sha Tsuen is a recognized village under the New Territories Small House Policy.

History
In May 2021, 100kg of cocaine was seized inside of the village.

Features
The Ng Fui Study Hall and the Villa of Tsan San in Pak Sha Tsuen are listed as Grade III historic buildings.

Education
Pak Sha Tsuen is in Primary One Admission (POA) School Net 73. Within the school net are multiple aided schools (operated independently but funded with government money) and one government school: South Yuen Long Government Primary School (南元朗官立小學).

See also
 Walled villages of Hong Kong

Reference

External links

 Delineation of area of existing village Pak Sha (Shap Pat Heung) for election of resident representative (2019 to 2022)
 Webpage about Pak Sha Tsuen
 Antiquities Advisory Board. Historic Building Appraisal. Ng Fui Study Hall, No. 116 Pak Sha Tsuen Pictures
 Antiquities Advisory Board. Historic Building Appraisal. 	Villa of Tsan San, Pak Sha Tsuen Pictures

Walled villages of Hong Kong
Shap Pat Heung
Villages in Yuen Long District, Hong Kong